Heartlands Academy is a coeducational secondary school located in the Nechells area of Birmingham, West Midlands, England.

Heartlands Academy offers GCSEs and BTECs for students at Key Stage 4. It is ranked the 11th best secondary school Birmingham, by progress 8 score.

History

Originally known as Duddeston Manor School and then Heartlands High School, the school converted to academy status on 1 September 2009 and was renamed Heartlands Academy. The academy is sponsored by E-ACT and moved into a new building in 2012.

GCSE results
Heartlands High School generally had low average percentage for 5+ GCSEs (or equivalent) A*-C including English & Mathematics in the past, with the lowest recorded being 11% back in 2003. However, since then, the average percentage has been going up steadily each year. Before the school turned to an academy in September 2009, the school had a percentage of 40% for the final year as Heartlands High School. Since becoming an academy in 2009, the results have been continuing to increase, reaching over 50% for the first time in 2012. Heartlands achieved their highest results in 2019, with 83% of students achieving a grade 4, equivalent to a low C.

Ofsted Reports
Heartlands High School was placed into special measures by Ofsted in 2003. Since appointing a new principal and a strong leadership team, the school went to good and improving in three years. In 2009 Heartlands High School was awarded Outstanding, the highest mark achievable in school Ofsted inspections. Since academy conversion, Heartlands Academy has continued to be awarded outstanding in 2012 and 2014.

Principals

Heartlands Academy 
Principals:

 2003 - 2015 Glynis Jones

Headteachers:
 2016 - 2016 Richard Tattersfield
 2016 - 2017 Helen Tanner 
 2017 - 2019 Fuzel Choudhury
2019–present Jenifer Clegg

Notable former pupils

Duddeston Manor School
Dennis Seaton, recording artist and record producer

Heartlands High School
Jacob Banks, singer-songwriter

References

External links
Heartlands Academy official website

Secondary schools in Birmingham, West Midlands
Academies in Birmingham, West Midlands
E-ACT
Educational institutions established in 2009
2009 establishments in England